Traralgon Showground is a cricket ground in Traralgon, Victoria, Australia.  The first recorded match held on the ground came when WSC Australia played WSC Cavaliers in the 1978 World Series Cricket.  A List A match was held there in the 2007–08 Ford Ranger Cup between Victoria and South Australia, which Victoria won by 4 wickets.

References

External links
Traralgon Showground at ESPNcricinfo
Traralgon Showground at CricketArchive
1993 Floods of Traralgon Showgrounds

Cricket grounds in Victoria (Australia)
Sports venues in Victoria (Australia)
World Series Cricket venues
Sports venues completed in 1978
1978 establishments in Australia